Qualification for Golf at the 2016 Summer Olympics in Rio de Janeiro, Brazil was determined not by any form of qualifying tournament, but by the rankings maintained by the International Golf Federation.

Qualification was based on world ranking (Official World Golf Ranking for men, Women's World Golf Rankings for women) as of 11 July 2016, with a total of 60 players qualifying in each of the men's and women's events. The top 15 players of each gender qualified, with a limit of four golfers per country that could qualify this way. The remaining spots went to the highest-ranked players from countries that did not already have two golfers qualified, with a limit of two per country. The IGF guaranteed that at least one golfer would qualify from the host nation and also at least one from each continent (Africa, the Americas, Asia, Europe, and Oceania). The IGF posted weekly lists of qualifiers based on current rankings for men and women.

Qualified players

Men

The following men removed themselves from possible qualification: 
Jason Day, Marc Leishman, Matt Jones, and Adam Scott of Australia 
Camilo Villegas of Colombia
Vijay Singh of Fiji
Victor Dubuisson of France
Shane Lowry, Graeme McDowell, and Rory McIlroy of Ireland 
Francesco Molinari of Italy
Hideki Matsuyama and Hideto Tanihara of Japan
Tim Wilkinson of New Zealand
Angelo Que of Philippines
Branden Grace, Louis Oosthuizen, and Charl Schwartzel of South Africa 
Kim Kyung-tae of South Korea
Miguel Ángel Jiménez of Spain
Dustin Johnson and Jordan Spieth of the United States
Brendon de Jonge of Zimbabwe

The Zika virus, which can cause serious birth defects and is currently epidemic in Brazil, can live longer in semen than in blood, and might thus infect a male golfer's partner for up to six months later or even more. Consequently, far more top male golfers than top female golfers withdrew from the games.

Qualification by country

Women

(a) = amateur

The following women removed themselves from possible qualification: 
Dottie Ardina of Philippines
Lee-Anne Pace of South Africa

The following women were removed from possible qualification by their NOC:
Christel Boeljon (ranked 35) and Anne van Dam (51) and first replacement Dewi Schreefel of the Netherlands
Cathryn Bristow (ranked 58) of New Zealand

Qualification by country

* Israel is a member of the European Olympic Committees.

References

Qualification for the 2016 Summer Olympics
Qualification